Kodlu Ramkrishna  is a Kannada film director from Tirthahalli in Karnataka.

Life and career
Kodlu Ramkrishna hails from Kodlu Village in Tirthahalli Taluk, Shimoga District. He has worked in the Kannada Film Industry for more than three decades. Kodlu has directed and produced 25 movies and 100 documentaries. He is one of the few directors who has directed movies on popular Kannada novels. He has got 4 state awards from state government. He has introduced many actors, actresses and singers to the Kannada film Industry including Diganth, Bhavana, M.D.Shridhar, Shamita Malnad, Guru Kiran (introduced to Tulu film industry), Rajesh Krishnan, etc. Hailing from a village, his main vision is to introduce more talents from the rural villages to the TV and Film Industry.

Filmography

References

External links

Kannada screenwriters
People from Shimoga district
Living people
Kannada film directors
20th-century Indian film directors
21st-century Indian film directors
Screenwriters from Karnataka
Year of birth missing (living people)